Nanzhao may refer to:

Nanzhao County (南召县), of Nanyang (南阳), Henan (河南省), China
Kingdom of Nanzhao (南詔), polity that flourished in south-west China and Southeast Asia during the 8th and 9th centuries
Nanzhao, Yingshang County (南照镇), a town in Yingshang County, Anhui (安徽省), China
Nanzhao, Zhao'an County (南诏), a town in Zhao'an County (诏安县), Fujian (福建省), China